The 3rd Virginia Infantry Regiment was an infantry regiment raised in Virginia for service in the Confederate States Army during the American Civil War. It fought mostly with the Army of Northern Virginia.

Organization

On October 16, 1856 at the direction of Governor Henry Alexander Wise, David Smith Walton was commissioned to command a new volunteer militia organization in Norfolk County denominated as 1st Battalion, 3rd Regimental Virginia Volunteers. Prior to his commission, Walton of North Carolina nativity was employed as a civil engineer working on the Erie Canal before removal to Portsmouth, Virginia in 1853. Walton's Battalion was composed of four armed and uniformed companies formerly attached to Portsmouth's 7th Regiment of the line.

The companies were as follows:

Portsmouth Riflemen under Captain William James Richardson

Established in 1792, this company was the oldest organization belonging to the 3rd. In fact in 1850, it received the designation of "Oldest Volunteer Company in the State of Virginia". The company employed Rifle Green uniforms with dark plumes on their caps.

Old Dominion Guard under Captain Edward Kearns

Organized June 26, 1856

Portsmouth National Light Infantry Greys under Captain P. H. Daughtrey

Organized June 4, 1856, the company employed grey frock coats and trousers and were described as handsomely dressed.

Newton Marion Rifles under Captain Johannis Watson

Organized August 1856, the company employed dark blue coats with three rows of state buttons down the front with green velvet collars, cuffs epaulets. Their trousers were dark blue with green velvet stripes and gold chords down the outer seam. The company employed the same cap as worn by the U.S. Army with a green plume tipped in black, velvet band and gold chords. In front beneath a brass bugle ornament were brass letters N.M.R.

Additional companies

From late 1856, up until the middle of the following year three more companies were introduce into the ranks of the 3rd, thus bringing it regimental designation.

These additional companies were as follows:

Dismal Swamp Rangers under Captain James C. Choate

Organized in late 1856 at Deep Creek

Portsmouth Light Artillery under Captain Virginius O. Cassell

Organized in 1808. On June 22, 1813, under Captain Arthur Emerson, this unit was stationed at Carney Island and conspicuous in the defeat of the British who attempted to capture Norfolk & Portsmouth. For a time, they were known as the Portsmouth Light Artillery Blues and later as the Portsmouth Light Artillery Guard. The company was dormant for a time and revived in late 1856.

Union Guard under Captain David J. Goodwin

Organized on June 17, 1857 and composed mostly of Irish-Americans

Prewar operations

1856 
July 3, 1856- In their first Parade, The Portsmouth National Light Infantry Grays marched out to Newtown on the suburbs of Portsmouth and were presented with a flag

October 19, 1856- Old Dominion Guard and Portsmouth National Light Infantry grays marched out to Newtown to attend the presentation of a national flag to the Newtown Marion Rifles. After the flag ceremony, the Guard, Grays & Rifles paraded through the main streets of Portsmouth.

1857 
April 7, 1857- Battalion election held. David Smith Walton elected Lt. Colonel and P. H. Daughtrey  of the Portsmouth National Light Infantry Grays elected Major

May 13, 1857- Portsmouth companies take part in 250th Anniversary of the settlement of Jamestown.

July 4, 1857- Dismal Swamp Rangers presented a Blue Silk Flag by the ladies of Deep Creek

October 19, 1857- Parade and Election. With the designation of Regiment, David Smith Walton elected Colonel, P. H. Daughtrey elected Lt. Colonel and James G. Hodges of the Marion Rifles elected Major.

November 12, 1857- 3rd Regiment traveled to Norfolk where they were received by volunteer companies of the city and escorted to the fair grounds marching to the music from a brass band belonging to the U.S. Navy Receiving Ship Pennsylvania. In the presence of thousands of spectators, Samuel T. Sawyer presented the regiment a silk flag on behalf of the ladies of Norfolk

December 2, 1857- Regiment headed again by the Brass Band of the Pennsylvania marched in procession to honor ex-president Franklin Pierce during his visit to Portsmouth.

1858 
Jan 8, 1858- 3rd Virginia in full force participated in target firing drills. The prize medal awarded to the best shot went to the Portsmouth Light Artillery

February- The remainder of January and early part of February were spent in preparation for the upcoming visit to Richmond. Here they would participate in ceremonies to honor George Washington on the occasion of his birthday as well as attend the dedication of Thomas Crawford's equestrian statue of which still stands in the Capitol Square. In the week leading up to departure, the companies drilled every evening so as their form would be of the utmost respect due the event. Finally on February 20, a quiet Saturday night, the regiment boarded the Steamer Coffee for a trip down the James River. They arrived about 8:30 the preceding morning and though the quarters were slightly unsatisfactory, they soon found refuge among the local regiments who provided them with food and merriment which would soon find them forgetful towards the poor accommodations.  Finally on Monday, February 22, the events for which they traveled commenced. In the cold sleet and snow the 25 militia and military organizations in attendance were divided into battalions with the 390 men of the 3rd almost constituting one whole battalion itself this being designated the 2nd Battalion. The parade was so immense that it took any given point an hour before the whole could pass. After the ceremonies, the visiting organizations took in the hospitality of the Richmond Militias armories where they were furnished as many forms of sustenance as could be desired. The following afternoon, about 4 P.M., the regiment again boarded the Steamer Coffee for the return trip home.

Jul 1, 1858- By springtime 1858 Captain John E. Deans who apparently replaced P. H. Daughtrey upon his election to Major as commander of the Portsmouth National Light Infantry Greys was brought before brigade court martial with the charges being disobedience to orders, sedition and contempt, and disrespecting the commanding officer of the regiment. He was sentenced this day to suspension of his command for the time of one month as well as censure in front of the public. Upon review, Governor Henry Alexander Wise approved the sentence with slight modifications, these being return of his command and a censure before the regiment in lieu of the public. The carrying out of this sentence was effected in early July during parade of the Greys per the governors orders.

Jul 26, 1858- The Portsmouth National Light Infantry Greys observed the passing of their second year with a target shoot occupying the hours of the day. Following this event, at about 9:00 that evening they gathered at the Masonic Hall for a celebratory feast which was enjoyed by all 80 of her ranks.  Speeches were given by Mayor George W. Grice, Lt. Colonel Daughtrey, Major Hodges and other regimental officers.

Aug 2, 1858- Captain William Lamb's Woodis Rifles of Norfolk visited Portsmouth and were entertained throughout the day by the Old Dominion Guard, National Greys & Portsmouth Light Artillery

Nov 20, 1858- In the final months of 1858 though the exact day is not noted, Colonel David Smith Walton stepped down as commanding officer of the regiment and was succeeded by the election of Major James Gregory Hodges. Captain David J. Godwin of the Union Guard was further chosen to fill the vacancy created by Hodges promotion.

1859 
July 4, 1859- Announced by sunrise salutes of the Portsmouth Light Artillery and from the Pennsylvania, by 8:00 A.M. the regiment was formed. After ceremonial preliminaries by Adjutant Frank M. Ironmonger, Colonel Hodges took command and marched the regiment through the towns principal streets to the Middle Street Presbyterian Church. A prayer by Dr. Bagwell opened the ceremony followed by reading of The Declaration of Independence by Lieutenant Fauth and addresses by Captain John W. H. Wrenn of the Marion Rifles as well as a patriotic poem by Dr. J. M. Covert, surgeon of the National Greys.

November 26, 1859- With rumors of attempts to free John Brown and his men, Governor Henry Alexander Wise called out militia from across the area. From the 3rd was called the Portsmouth National Light Infantry Greys while the rest of the regiment was put in a state of readiness. On the following day, the National Greys boarded the Steamship Louisiana along with the Captain Lamb's Woodis Riffles of Norfolk en route to Baltimore. Upon their arrival in Baltimore on Monday, the two companies boarded a train to Harper's Ferry and were then stationed at Charles Town.

December 1, 1859- Colonel Hodges received orders to hold the recently revived Old Dominion Guard which had been inactive for nearly a year in readiness under Captain A. J. Culpepper being selected to relieve the National Greys. However, before such orders were carried out the crisis surrounding John Brown subsided.

December 2, 1859- On the day of John Browns execution, The National Greys were stationed in the yard of the courthouse where they occupied the first floor. Following the execution the company held a mock trial for John Brown which attracted much attention.

December 16, 1859-  On the occasion of the execution of John E. Cook, The National Greys as well as the Woodis Rifles were stationed behind the gallows between two pieces of artillery. Three days later with a parting salute from the Alexandria Artillery the Greys and Rifles left Charles Town. Upon reaching Harper's Ferry, they toured the armory before departing by train for home.

1860 
May- About the middle of the month former Captain of the Old Dominion Guard, Edward Kearns was elected to reprise his role as commander of the company.

July 4, 1860- At 5 A.M. the 3rd assembled for their annual observance of the Fourth of July. After marching through the streets, Colonel Hodges took the regiment to Norfolk where they made illustrious parade before breakfast. The Union Guard however was not among them having been inactive for some time and forthwith being disbanded by years end.

Secession
On the eve of Secession, April 16, 1861, the 3rd Regiment of Virginia Volunteers was composed of the following companies.

Portsmouth Rifle Company under Captain John C. Owens

Portsmouth Light Artillery under Captain Carney F. Grimes

Newton Marion Rifles under Captain Johannis Watson

Old Dominion Guard under Captain Edward Kearns

Portsmouth National Light Infantry Greys under Captain John E. Deans

Dismal Swamp Rangers under Captain James C. Choate

On April 17, 1861, the Virginia state legislature by a vote of 88–55, passed the ordinance of secession which would be remanded to a vote of the people the following month.

Civil War (1861-1865)

Militia Service

April 1861 
In the early morning hours of the 19th, Major General William Booth Taliaferro, under orders from Governor John Letcher arrived in the City of Norfolk and established his headquarters at the Atlantic Hotel on Main Street. Although the sun had not yet risen, local militia commanders from within the city, as well as neighboring Portsmouth wasted no time in seeking to report their numbers and condition as well as procure any orders which were handed down by the governor.  Taliaferro, in reporting back to the governor described the situation as such.

“I found the military force of the city, none of which had been called into service to consist of a battalion of volunteers and a few detached companies in all numbering not a great deal over 300 men and the force of the town of Portsmouth to consist of a regiment of volunteers of about the same strength. The militia of the two towns were without arms and there was no naval force in the State service to cooperate with me. The only artillery consisted of a few 6 pounder field pieces. The harbor of Norfolk and approaches thereto were entirely unprotected against attack from Federal vessels.”

These twelve organizations, which including the 3rd Virginia companies numbered in total approximately eight hundred and fifty men, however they had in their possession no form of ammunition.

On the evening of the 19th, Taliaferro knowing the importance of securing powder for his troops as well as the state, ordered the Independent Greys under Captain Richard C. Taylor to seize the powder magazine at Fort Norfolk. This was accomplished without firing a single shot and yielded 2,800 barrels of powder as well as other munitions. The whole of the Norfolk Force was then employed in removal of such supplies with 1,300 barrels placed on board a vessel bound for Richmond and 1,500 placed outside of the range of federal artillery within the area.

On April 20, by order of the governor, the 3rd Virginia  was mustered into service and was assembled under arms by approximately  2 o’clock that afternoon. They then preceded to march through the town's main thoroughfares in a show of strengthen before retiring for the evening with exception of the Portsmouth Artillery which in order to bolster their two brass 6 pound cannons secured several light artillery pieces from a revenue cutter within the harbor. The regiment as a whole was then quartered within the Portsmouth Court House & City Hall, while the artillery pieces were station on the corner of Court & High Street.

About sunrise the following morning, the regiment parted ways with the Portsmouth National Light Infantry Greys, Old Dominion Guard & Portsmouth Rifles reporting to the Gosport (Norfolk) Naval Yard for the purpose of salvaging munitions, ships & supplies abandoned when federal troops in a hasty retreat set the yard ablaze. A quite intriguing tale as to how members within the 3rd perhaps saved the large stone dry dock is found within the records of Norfolk events as follows:

"Privates David A. Williams, of the Old Dominion Guard, and Joseph F. Weaver, of the Portsmouth Rifle Company, attracted by curiosity, strolled down to the dry dock, and, looking down into it, noticed a train of loose powder, leading down to the culvert at the northeast corner. Mr. Williams immediately ran down into the dock and broke the connection by kicking one of the planks down. They then hunted for the fuse or slow match, but did not succeed in finding it, and concluded that after the train was laid the orders to blow it up had been countermanded, or that there had been some other hitch in the proceedings."

Meanwhile, the remainder of the regiment consisting of the Portsmouth Light Artillery, Newton Marion Rifles & Dismal Swamp Rangers, reported to the Hospital Point this being the location of the Naval Hospital and began assisting in the erection of a defensive battery along the bluff overlooking the Elizabeth River. By nightfall, the regiment was reunited at Hospital Point with the exception of the Portsmouth National Light Infantry Greys which remained at the Naval Yard.

Over the next week, the 3rd Virginia provided the necessary labor to achieve the construction of the defensive battery along Hospital Point. Much to the surprise of the regiment, former commander David Smith Walton, who had returned to engineering, was assigned to oversee the work.  On April 27, engineer Andrew Talcott reported that 10 guns ((2) 8” Shell & (8) 32-pounders) had thus far been mounted at the Naval Hospital and by weeks end 2 more were added completing the battery. While the men labored away another change occurred which undoubtedly affected the regiment as William B. Taliaferro was relieved from command of the Norfolk area militia's. Though the official order was not penned until April 26, Taliaferro reported having received such by the 21st and relinquished his command to Major General Walter Gwynn on the 22nd, returning to Richmond.

On April 28, a member of the Newton Marion Rifles was arrested for expressing “treasonable & seditious” pro union sentiments.

The month came to a close with the temporary detachment of two of the regiments companies.  The Portsmouth Rifle Company was sent to Pig Point at the mouth of the Nansemond River to construct a defensive battery and train in artillery. They would later become the first company to see action in operations against federal ship U.S.S. Harriet Lane. The Old Dominion Guard was also dispatched to serve the battery at Pinners Point. These detachments may have been made in response to correspondence April 30 between General Gwynn and Adjutant General R.S. Garnett. Within such correspondence, Garnett highlights the lack of defenses along the Nansemond as described by engineer Andrew Talcott and further laments that if federal troops were landed at such location they may overrun local forces and reacquire control of Gosport Naval Yard. The remainder of the regiment spent their time quartered on the 3rd Floor of the Naval Hospital while training to operate the artillery weaponry they had now installed.

May 1861 
As a new month dawned, rumors began to fly about a perceived attack which was to be orchestrated against Norfolk. As such, on May 2, General Gwynn received orders directing removal of all valuable goods which may be of use to the state and not needed by the command.

The following day, General Gwynn was authorized to call out additional men and arrange them into regiments with particular emphasis placed upon associating those from like sections of the state. In this process, changes befell the regiment as Colonel Hodges and Lt. Colonel Godwin were removed from command of the 3rd Virginia and eventually assigned to the 14th Virginia. Third in charge, Major William C. Wingfield was also removed from his position. This change was said to have been made in the interest of good discipline as it was feared friendly commanders would be unwilling to perform the necessary discipline against their brotherly subordinates.

As such, the 3rd Virginia usurer in the tenure of perhaps their best known commander, Colonel Roger Atkinson Pryor. Just below Pryor was second in command Lt. Colonel Fletcher H. Archer followed by Major James Mayo Jr.

With these changes in place, General Gwynn then sent requisition for approximately 100,000 rounds of musket ammunition, of which they had none. Answer to this requisition came on the 5th stating they would receive only 25,000, this being all which could be spared at the time. They were further ordered to use the bulk lead in combination with the seized powder to produce the remainder locally.

On May 16, the Portsmouth Light Artillery was dispatched to Hoffler's Creek to guard the shore between Carney Island and the Nansemond River.

After just over a month at Hospital Point, the vote on succession having been approved April 17 was laid before the people in whole on the 23rd. As such the men of the 3rd were sent small groups to the courthouse to cast their votes. This however did not proceed as expected when 14 of the first 15 men of the Marion Rifles voted to against the resolution. When word of the results reached Pryor, he had the men temporary imprisoned on the lower floor of the hospital while awaiting the advice of the governor who stated “release them immediately” as the vote was not predicated on coercion but rather the honest feeling of the voter, whatever that may be. However, it became apparent that the rifles had conflicted views and could not continue to serve a cause which they were not invested within. As such the following morning Pryor assembled the regiment, ordered the rifles to step forward and ground their arms after which he disbanded the company.

The month ended with another shakeup in the command structure as General Walter Gwynn resigned his command of the Norfolk Area, taking a position with the North Carolina Volunteers, commanding outer coastal defense. General Benjamin Huger was chosen as his successor by Special Order #109 on May 23.

June 1861 
June ushered in new experiences as the Portsmouth Rifle Company became the first within the regiment to engage the enemy. This engagement took place on the 5th and was known as The Battle of Pig Point in which the revenue cutter Harriet Lane laid shell upon the newly constructed battery at Pig Point in effort to assess its strength. After the initial confusion, the company composed itself and returned fire striking the ship and injuring 6 aboard at which point the vessel disengaged.

On the following day, approximately 30 former members of the Newton Marion Rifles along with several new recruits began the formation of a new company within the regiment. Under Captain Alonzo B. Jordan, they would now be known as the Virginia Rifles. At this time several new companies came on board, and the disposition of the regiment was as follows:

Existing companies 
Portsmouth National Light Infantry Greys under Captain John E. Deans

Portsmouth Rifle Company under Captain John C. Owens

Portsmouth Light Artillery under Captain Carney F. Grimes

Dismal Swamp Rangers under Captain James C. Choate

Old Dominion Guard under Captain Edward Kearns

New companies 
Virginia Riflemen under Captain Alonzo B. Jordan

Norfolk County Patriots under Captain William H. Etheredge

Virginia Artillery under Captain William James Richardson

St. Brides Cavalry/Light Guard under Captain John Edward Doyle

Dinwiddle Rifle Greys under Captain John C. Griffin

On June 7, The Dinwiddle Greys, Dismal Swamp Rangers & Virginia Riflemen were ordered to Isle of Wright County near Zuni. Here they established Camp Huger, so named after their commanding general, on the Norfolk & Petersburg Railroad. Pryor was given command of all forces at Camp Huger. From correspondence between Robert E. Lee and Capt. Ruffin of the Virginia Volunteers, it appears that this camp was established on suspicion the enemy may land at Burwell's Bay and proceed to occupy the railroad.

A scattered regiment 
A transcription made by Colonel Pryor as to the disposition of his men on June 15 shows that the regiment was wholly disengaged from each other as only 3 of the 10 companies were within his orbit. At Camp Huger the Dismal Swamp Rangers, Virginia Riflemen & Dinwiddle Rifle Greys remained quartered while the Norfolk County Patriots and Portsmouth National Light Infantry Greys continued their work at the Gosport Naval Yard. The remainder were all stationed at separate points along the peninsula as follows:

Pinners Point- Old Dominion Guard

Pig Point- Portsmouth Rifle Company

Hoffler Creek- Portsmouth Light Artillery

Carney Island- Virginia Artillery

Sewell's Point- St. Brides Cavalry/Light Guard

On June 22, Colonel Pryor made known his frustration to Richmond Authorities about the scattered nature of his regiment. However soon this would be the least of his worries as the turn of the month would bring complete reorganization to his ranks.

July (1st-12th) 1861 
At the turn of the month, The Virginia Artillery, Portsmouth Rifles & Old Dominion Guard were transferred to the 9th Virginia Regiment. The Norfolk County Patriots withdrew and would eventually become part of 41st Virginia Regiment. Furthermore, The Portsmouth Light Artillery was removed and made an independent company known as the “Grimes Battery” in honor of its Captain who was killed at Sharpsburg and the  St. Brides Cavalry received transfer to the 5th Virginia Cavalry. Thus leaving the regiment in shambles with only four functioning companies. This would be rectified rather quickly however with the following additions in the upcoming days:

Nansemond Rangers under Captain William J. Arthur- Joined Aft. Jun 30

James River Artillery under Captain Alexander D. Callcote-  Joined Aft. Jun 30

Cockade Rifles under Captain Joseph V. Scott-  Joined Abt. Jun 30

Southampton Greys under Captain William H. Hood-  Joined July 1

Rough & Ready Guards under Captain Richard P. Clements-  Joined July 3

Surry Light Artillery under Captain Thomas W. Ruffin-  Joined Abt. Jul 8

On July 2, In compliance with orders received from the Headquarters of the Virginia Forces at Richmond, Pryor moved his regiment from Camp Huger to their new station at Day's Neck called Camp Cook named so after James Watkins Cook, owner of the property on which the camp resided.

On or about the 12th of the month, The 3rd Virginia was officially accepted into the ranks of the CSA thus ending its services as a Virginia Militia.

Confederate States of America Service 
Upon their acceptance into the CSA, The 3rd Virginia shed its familiar and unique company designations in favor of the simple alphabetic designation system which is still in use today. As such the organization of the regiment was as follows:

Company A (Dismal Swamp Rangers) Capt. James C. Choate

Company B (Virginia Riflemen) Capt. Alonzo B. Jordan

Company C (Dinwiddle Greys) Capt. John C. Griffin

Company D (Southampton Greys) Capt. William H. Hood

Company E (Cockade Rifles) Capt. Joseph V. Scott

Company F (Nansemond Rangers) Capt. William J. Arthur

Company G (Rough & Ready Guards) Capt. Richard P. Clements

Company H (National Light Infantry Greys) Capt. John E. Deans

Company I (Surry Light Artillery) Capt. Thomas W. Ruffin

Company K (James River Artillery) Capt. Alexander D. Callcote

Remainder of July 
With their official entry into confederate service, the regiment was placed in John Clifford Pemberton's 1st Brigade which was composed of the 3rd Virginia, 3rd North Carolina Volunteers (13th North Carolina), 4th North Carolina Volunteers (14th North Carolina), Wilson's Virginia Battalion and Manley's North Carolina Light Artillery. By mid-July, 5 32 pound artillery pieces had been mounted at Fort Boykin to be served by the men of the 3rd.

On July 18, Company G was dispatched about 5 miles west to Vellines Farm on the other side of Burwells Bay to guard the landing at Stone House Wharf while another unidentified company was sent to guard two nearby landings.

August 1861 
As the month commenced, Halifax County Sheriff James R. West began organizing a company of infantry for future service in the CSA. Although they would not officially enlist until late October, West spent the month enrolling men throughout the county in the Halifax Rifles also known as the High Hill Rifles.

On the 5th, Company K was dispatched to Fort Boykin for duty where they would remain through late November.

Towards mid month, with news surrounding the events of the First Manassas being dispensed, Company H which had been stationed at the Gosport Naval Yard since the outbreak of hostilities requested of General Huger to be reunited with the regiment fearing they would miss the war.  Their first request was dismissed, however upon submitting a second they received the news they had sought and on the 21st left the naval yard. Escorted by the 3rd Regiment of Georgia, they took the Norfolk & Petersburg train to Zuni and from there marched to Camp Cook arriving the following day. The feeling of idleness was also present within the regiment who described themselves as "being buried at Smithfield" so much so that on the 9th of the month, Colonel Pryor sent a secret dispatch to his friend James M. Mason requesting that he leverage his power as a Virginia congressmen to secure transfer to a more active regiment whatever their present disposition may be. The following is an excerpt from that letter:

"In my present situation, I foresee no possible chance of meeting the enemy. For the chance of striking a blow for my country, I will give up the command of a well drilled regiment."

On the 29th at the Halifax County Court Day, The Halifax Rifles were organized into ranks designating them the 15th company to be formed from such area.

An accounting of Arms during the month showed that like other regiments within the state, the 3rd had no consistency and weaponry varied from company to company. Company C had the finest arms within the regiment being .54 Caliber Mississippi Rifles, Companies F & H were armed with .69 Caliber Flintlocks altered to use percussion caps. The remainder of the regiment appear to have been armed with standard flintlocks of which it was stated by one Major Wilson of unknown affiliation "These men are brave, but the inferiority of their arms produces a feeling of insecurity among them".

As the month came to a close, it was marked by training of the Surry Light Artillery (Company I). Colonel Pryor was determined that this company would become a well drilled infantry company and as such enlisted Sergent William H. Bloxom of Company H to drill them in such endeavors. Colonel Pryor would later rescind these intentions after witnessing the company's proficiency at the artillery range in which they scored direct hits on all four of their targets.

September 1861 
September as a whole held ups and downs for the regiment.

On September 11, Captain Alonzo B. Jordan of Company B resigned his position due to illness and was replaced by the company adjutant John W. H. Wrenn. He would later return to service as a private in the 41st Virginia Regiment. About the same time, due to disagreements with Colonel Pryor, 1st Lieutenant William C. Taylor also submitted his resignation.

It wasn't all bad however and there were several events which brought forth excitement within the regiment. The first of these occurred around mid-month when the officers of the regiment presented Major Joseph Mayo with a "Splendid Horse". A few days following these events on the 24th, William L. Watkins and his delegation on behalf of the ladies of Petersburg presented the regiment with a blue silk state flag in appreciation of their efforts. According to accounts, the delegation came by steamboat and presented the gift to the regiment along the shores of the James River. Mrs Sara Pryor, the wife of Colonel Pryor paints a vivid portrait of the events:

"an interesting picture of my colonel as he stood with his long hair waving in the stiff breeze listening to the brave things the dear women's spokesman said of their devotion to him and to their country."

In a customary response of thanks Pryor expressed his gratitude and begged forgiveness for the present idleness within the regiment.

Much like its rocky beginnings, the month ended with yet more resignations.

On the 28th Captain John C. Griffin of Company C submitted his resignation due to illness and was replaced by Captain Henry E. Orgain, a newcomer to the regiment. Meanwhile, Company G. became disaffected with the leadership of Captain Clements and petitioned for his removal which he obliged by resigning. He would be replaced by Henry S. Howard, also a newcomer to the regiment.

October 1861 
In mid October, the regiment began work on winter quarters leaving Camp Cook for the more inland location of Camp Pemberton. A short distance away on the farm of Chapman Edwards, work on Camp Pemberton consumed much of the regiments day with construction commencing at 7:00 AM and continuing through 4:00 PM with a break during the noon hour. Following completion of these activities the regiment then spent its time drilling in dress parade for approximately 2 hours before settling for the night to repeat the task once again as morning dawned.

In a letter dtd. Dec 10, 1861, Private Benjamin William Jones of Company I. recounted the disposition of the camp to and unknown friend as follows:

"My Dear Friend:—We, that is the whole Regiment, are in winter quarters now, good and comfortable log cabins, built by the men, the several Companies each

by itself, all arranged around three sides of a large square, or campus, the quarters of the Regimental officers occupying the fourth side. In the open space within, which has been cleared of all debris, the Regimental

and Company roll-calls take place, and squad drills of new recruits are conducted."

On October 19, Lt Col. Fletcher H. Archer was detached from the regiment in order to take command of another at Camp Huger. This only heightened Colonel Page's frustrations as he had neither a commissary or quartermaster officer at the time and as such the duty of procuring supplies of wood and forage fell upon himself within thin ranks. He made these frustrations known in the following statement to unknown parties:

"We are in the midst of preparing for winter quarters. By formal order the general commanding, the brigade has devolved upon me the responsibility of procuring a supply of wood and forage. Thus embarrassed by extra and ordinary cares and difficulties', I venture to request that I may be furnished with that staff officer, without whose assistance I cannot possibly provide for the comfort of my command."

As the month came to a close, Halifax County Sheriff James R. West officially enlisted his men for service at the Halifax Court House on the 28th. Known as the Halifax Rifles or High Hill Rifles, the company was organized starting in August with men of Halifax County. They represented the 15th such company to originate from Halifax County which throughout the war would far exceed any expected contributions of manpower.

November 1861 
As the trees of autumn shed their colors transitioning into the upcoming winter, changes also occurred within the command structure as Major James Mayo was promoted to Lt. Colonel on the 6th thus becoming 2nd in command. This left a vacancy in the position of Major which would be filled by Joseph V. Scott, Captain of Co. E on the same day. To fill his vacancy 1st Lt. Thomas Pannill, Adjutant of Co. E was commissioned on the 9th thus completing the matter.

The following day the regiment officially transferred to winter quarters at Camp Pemberton where they would remain thru April 1862.

About the same time in the capital of Richmond, Captain James R. West, Sheriff of Halifax County, arrived with his Halifax Rifles seeking orders from the confederate leaders. They would muster in on the 11th however expedience would not provide them a place until the early part of the following month and as such they sat idle.

Much to the relief of Colonel Pryor, he was finally able to procure a commissary officer in the form of Timothy Reeves. Reeves, a lawyer from Prince George County was appointed the rank of captain and took the position over on the 16th of the month.

December 1861 
The month began with the addition of a new company as on December 3 the Halifax Rifles were officially attached to the regiment as Company L. As such, On the following day the men boarded the Steamer Northampton at Richmond en route to the James River and Camp Pemberton. With heightened security on the waterways of Virginia, The trip down the James took a good part of the day and the Rifles would not arrive until the morning of the 5th. Upon arrival they immediately set to work establishing a temporary camp for themselves consisting of canvas tents while they procured supplies to construct shanty log cabins like those of the other companies. For this purpose on the 9th, Captain West requested 5000 feet of lumber, 4 kegs of nails, 8 sets of door hinges as well as window sashes for their cabins as well as to construct and extra ward on the encampments hospital quarters.

By mid month rumors began to fly concerning the departure of General Pemberton for other locations further south. As such in his absence on the 15th, Colonel Pryor being the senior officer in camp conducted a brigade review of the approximately 4,000 troops under the command of the 1st Brigade. By Christmas Eve, the rumors were substantiated as Raleigh Edward Colston was appointed his replacement.

The year ended in an uneventful manner under what were perhaps the best quarters the company would occupy over the next four years of the war and I am assured that many a man reminisced of the peaceful days along the James in the winter of 1861.

January & February 1862 
The early months brought with them a mild winter with little snowfall and perhaps nothing else. In fact, aside from guard duty and daily drill the men spent their time stoically awaiting the return of spring with its promise of future conflict. In Camp, some men assembled nightly for singing while others played cards or similar games and read their bibles.

Rations were plentiful throughout, consisting of coffee, flour, bacon, beef, sugar and sometimes rice and as such illness was kept to a marginal level. There were also those rations which nature provided in the form of wild game which led to interesting circumstances surrounding the introduction racoon meat by men of the Company H. This led some to declare they would not partake of such even in the smallest form for the sum of $1.00. However, after several of the men had indulged and found the dish palatable, supply began to suffer eventually running out.

There was also one particular item which though prohibited found its way into the camp through extraordinary means. At Smithfield, brandy & whisky were readily available and though strict orders were given to the townsmen that such libations should not be sold to the men, they found their way yet into camp. It became so problematic that those returning from pass were inspected before entering and yet somehow such products still found themselves among the men. It was later discovered that the means by which the spirits were smuggled included hollowed out yams and even musket barrels. As such, many a man found themselves doing doubled guard duty or at times facing sterner punishment for breach of military order.

As February came to a close rumors began to abound of an early start to operations due in part to the mild winter.  Private Benjamin William Jones of Company I in another letter dated February 10 put it as follows:

"matters seem shaping themselves for active operations, and the spring campaign is expected to

open early. The armies on the Peninsula are astir, though it is yet winter, and fighting may occur at some point very soon."

March 1862 

March began much like the end of the preceding month with rumors of active operation, yet little but idleness to occupy the regiments time. Change however was afoot and soon rumor became reality with the commencement of the Peninsula Campaign.  .

On the 17th, Union General George B. McClellan with a flotilla of 300 vessels transported both man and machine to Fortress Monroe on the tip of the Virginia peninsula with hopes of marching on to the confederate capital of Richmond . This prompted General Robert E. Lee to issue orders to Colston's brigade that should attack fall upon Major Gen. Magruder at Yorktown, he and his men were to cross the James at Stone House Wharf and reinforce Magurder. The following excerpt from said orders best illustrates the general disposition of the orders:

"It is not intended that you shall cross the river until you have positive evidence that a demonstration is being made against General Magruder. The move on the peninsula may be a feint and the real attack be on Norfolk."

Somewhere along the way however, through either eagerness or confusion, on the night of 28th, the 3rd Virginia crossed the James reaching the opposite bank at daybreak and then began marching towards Yorktown. Arriving the night of the 29th, they established Camp Pryor on the Curtis Farm outside the city where they suffered thru cold rain since in their hasty departure no time was allotted to gather their tents.

April 1862 
As the month turned, reports of the unseasonable departure reached General Lee who on March 31 dispatched a letter to Magruder addressing the troop shortage created in the Department of Norfolk by the premature movement. As such on April 2, Assistant Adjutant General Henry Bryan relayed orders to General Colston as follows:

"General Magruder directs me to request you to send the steamer Allison, with any other transportation you may have, to Grove's Wharf as speedily as possible, to convey back to you the two regiments under Col. R. A. Pryor. The present indications are that these troops will be needed on your side, and General Magruder is therefore ordered to send them to their former position. There is no transportation now on this side."

By the following day, members of the 3rd Virginia were again resting comfortably at Camp Pemberton with the exception of two unfortunate souls overcome by exposure to the elements. It was to be however a short lived reprieve as on April 4 with the drums of war beating a long roll the regiment was turned out to embark once more at Stone House Wharf . Reaching Grove Wharf on the opposite bank by 10 that evening, through mud and water the brigade marched to the Warwick-Yorktown Line. Here they arrived at Dam #2 (Lee's Mill) along the Warwick River where depending on which sources you consult the Battle or Skirmish at Lees Mill Occurred on the 5th.

Marking the beginning of the Siege of Yorktown, this particular engagement signified the starting point of Union General McClellan's advance up the peninsula. McClellan whose maps led him to mistakenly believe the Warwick River flowed only parallel to the James River was met with surprise when it was discovered to instead continue northeast providing a rather astute defensive barrier. The strength of this line was further fortified by the falling of trees and erection of various dams in the preceding days which produced 2 to 3 foot deep ponds forward of the line. This led union forces to probe the defenses for weak portions resulting in the days events.

Though the whole of the regiment would be engaged, three particular companies were highlighted for their extraordinary composure under fire, these being Company D. stationed in the rifle pits forward of the main defensive line, Company E. who though balls were passing overhead conserved their powder for moments when it was assured to have a union man in the sights and Company A. who in neck deep water spent 24 hours fortifying the defenses of the main line and in whole gave three continuous days of service.

Although the results of the engagement were inconclusive, the strategic victory lay with the Confederates who through an elaborate ruse deceived McClellan into believing their force more numerous. This lead the Union to construct siege fortifications along the Warwick River, delaying their advance by four weeks when in actuality their far superior numbers could have easily routed the small force. The Confederates in turn used this opportunity to construct defensive positions along their side of the river and bring up reinforcements which swelled their numbers and brought forth re-organization.

Department of the Peninsula 

On April 12, General Joseph E. Johnston was given command of the Department of the Peninsula which was then subdivided into three separate wings along the Warwick Line of which the 3rd Virginia was placed in Major General Longstreet's Division occupying the center defenses. General Magruder was placed on Longstreet right towards mulberry island on the south, and General D. H. Hill occupied the north extending to Yorktown, thus completing the line. As such for the next several weeks the men dug in constructing fortifications and awaiting any further attacks which never came for the 3rd Virginia.

These were not however the only changes afoot as on April 16 Colonel Pryor was promoted to Brigadier General in a change most welcomed by many of the men who had grown dissatisfied with his leadership style. He would not for the time being relinquish his duties as colonel and on April 20 a confrontation with Company H under Captain John E. Deans occurred. Captain Deans had been authorized in February to organize a battalion of Portsmouth Volunteers which had not materialized and with the expiration of their enlistment the men of Company H stacked their arms with most of the men reenlisting in other commands. When news reached Pryor he mustered the Greys and exchanged angered words accusing them of not shirking from the upcoming battle at which time Corporal John W. Lingo who spoke for the company stated the following

"Colonel Pryor, we are not leaving on account of the enemy or approaching battle, but we do not desire to serve any longer under your command, but if we are put under the immediate command of Major Scott, every man will cheerfully remain here until the battle is over"

Colonel Pryor then requested that all who desire this outcome please step forward and with exception of four men all did so. Pryor then ordered Major Scott to march these men to Yorktown and place them in the jailhouse for mutiny. When Lieutenant James Dongan protested the treatment of the company he too was confined to the jailhouse. The matter was finally settled when officers of the regiment familiar with the new conscription law passed just days prior on April 16 informed the men that all previous reenlistment laws were now void and they would be required to finish their service with the regiment. Colonel Pryor for his part apologized for his language and treatment of the company but for some these words fell short. Edgar Ashton of the company H illustrates this perfectly with the following:

"I never will forget how he served the company at Yorktown, which no doubt you heard of and where we were on the 20th of April which was Sunday. I never will forget the day as long as I live!

A similar event occurred with company B, who around the same time reenlisted with the understanding they would be transferred to a regiment under organization by Colonel David J. Godwin of the 14th Virginia. When the men protested the perceived sleight of hand Colonel Pryor once again charge mutiny and placed several of the company and Lieutenant George W. Hutchins under arrest. This matter like the other was resolved in time and on April 27 all was right once more when under the new conscription law, the 3rd Virginia was reorganized. Under the terms of this law, all men previously enlisted as well as new members would be required to give 3 years service to their respective organizations.

The regimental elections resulted in the following command structure and most notably the ouster of Roger Atkinson Pryor

Colonel Joseph Mayo (Previously Lieutenant Colonel)

Lieutenant Colonel Joseph V. Scott (Previously Major)

Major Alexander D. Callcott (Previously Captain of Company K)

During this reorganization, Company I, The Surry Light Artillery was detached to become and independent organization thus bringing the regiment back down to 10 companies as follows:

Company A (Dismal Swamp Rangers) Capt. Thomas M. Hodges

Company B (Virginia Riflemen) Capt. John W. H. Wrenn

Company C (Dinwiddle Greys) Capt. William H. Pryor

Company D (Southampton Greys) Capt. Charles F. Urquhart

Company E (Cockade Rifles) Capt. Thomas Pannill

Company F (Nansemond Rangers) Capt. C. Crawley Phillips

Company G (Rough & Ready Guards) Capt. Henry S. Howard

Company H (Portsmouth National Greys) Capt. John D. Whitehead

Company I (James River Artillery) Capt. James B. Gwaltney (Previously Company K)

Company K (Halifax Rifles) Capt. James R. West (Previously Company L)

See also

List of Virginia Civil War units

References

Virginia Regimental History Series: 3rd Virginia Infantry, Lee A. Wallace.

Units and formations of the Confederate States Army from Virginia
1861 establishments in Virginia
Military units and formations established in 1861
1865 disestablishments in Virginia
Military units and formations disestablished in 1865